Rafat Hussain ا: رفعت حسین  is an Associate Professor of Population Health, at the Australian National University Medical School & the Centre for Research on Ageing, Health and Wellbeing (CRAHW), Research School of Population Health, Australian National University, Canberra. She was previously a Professor of Public Health and Deputy Head of the School of Rural Medicine at the University of New England in Armidale, New South Wales, Australia.

Career
From 1987 to 1993 she worked as an academic at the Aga Khan University, Karachi, where she was actively involved in teaching, clinical care and establishment of primary health care programs.

Hussain has worked as a senior lecturer in the Department of Public Health and Nutrition at University of Wollongong and as a visiting fellow at the National Centre for Epidemiology and Population Health.

References

Pakistani public health doctors
People from Karachi
Australian epidemiologists
Australian Muslims
Pakistani emigrants to Australia
Living people
Place of birth missing (living people)
Year of birth missing (living people)
Dow Medical College alumni
Academic staff of Aga Khan University
Australian academics of Pakistani descent
Australian National University alumni
Academics from Karachi